The Fitzmaurice River is a river in the Northern Territory of Australia.

Course
The river drains into the Joseph Bonaparte Gulf in the Timor Sea from a source just north of the Wombungi homestead.  The river flows in a westerly direction between the Wingate mountains to the north and the Yamberra Mountains to the south. The area is quite remote and largely unsettled, and the river itself forms the southern boundary of the township of Wadeye.

The estuary formed at the river mouth is tidal in nature and in near pristine condition.

Catchment

Fauna
A total of 16 species of fish are found in the river including the glassfish, Macleay's glassfish, fork-talked catfish, fly-specked hardyhead, mouth almighty, spangled perch, barramundi, oxeye herring, rainbowfish, exquisite rainbowfish, northern trout gudgeon, bony bream, catfish, and the seven-spot archerfish.

A large number of crocodiles—both saltwater and fresh—inhabit the river. Wild cattle and bush pigs can be found in the surrounding countryside.

History
It was first charted in 1839 by European explorers aboard  under the command of John Lort Stokes. It was named after Lewis Roper Fitzmaurice, a mate and assistant surveyor on Beagle.

In 1977, Australian bushman Rodney Ansell was stuck for months on the river, after his boat capsized in the estuary and he ventured upstream for a source of fresh water.

See also

References

External links
 Fitzmaurice.info
 Epress.anu.edu.au
 Kempen.id.au

Rivers of the Northern Territory